The 1985–86 UC Irvine Anteaters men's basketball team represented the University of California, Irvine during the 1985–86 NCAA Division I men's basketball season. The Anteaters were led by sixth year head coach Bill Mulligan and played their home games at the Crawford Hall. They were members of the Pacific Coast Athletic Association. They finished the season 17–13 and 12–6 in PCAA play. UCI defeated conference champion UNLV twice, both while the Rebels were ranked in the top 10, once on each team's home court.

Previous season 
The 1984–85 UC Irvine Anteaters men's basketball team returned finished with a record of 13–17 and 8–10 in PCAA play. Junior Forward/Center Tod Murphy received AP Honorable Mention All-American Honors.

Roster

Schedule

|-
!colspan=9 style=|Non-Conference Season

|-
!colspan=9 style=|Conference Season

|-
!colspan=9 style=| PCAA tournament

|-
!colspan=9 style=| NIT

Source

References

UC Irvine Anteaters men's basketball seasons
UC Irvine
Uc Irvine
UC Irvine Anteaters
UC Irvine Anteaters